Jordan Duggan (born 7 January 1998) is an Irish rugby union player, currently playing for Pro14 and European Rugby Champions Cup side Connacht. He plays as a prop.

Connacht
Duggan made his Connacht debut against Ulster in round 14 on the 2019-20 Pro14 on 23 August 2020.

References

External links
itsrugby.co.uk Profile
Connacht Rugby Profile

1998 births
Living people
Irish rugby union players
Connacht Rugby players
Rugby union props
Rugby union players from County Kildare